Micah Solusod is an American voice actor. His best-known role in anime has been the title character Soul Evans in Soul Eater, which was broadcast on Adult Swim's programming block Toonami. He debuted as Malek Yildrim Werner in Blassreiter, and later went on to play Toma Kamijo in A Certain Magical Index, Yuichiro Hyakuya in Seraph of the End, Yuno in Black Clover, and Yuri Plisetsky in Yuri on Ice.

Personal life
Outside of voice acting, Solusod is a freelance artist, where he posts on DeviantArt. He also works on original web comic series called Ties That Bind.

Solusod married voice actress Apphia Yu in 2016.

He is of Japanese and Filipino descent.

Filmography

Anime

Animation

Films

Video games

References

External links
 
 Micah Solusod convention appearances on AnimeCons.com
 
 

Living people
American male actors of Filipino descent
American male actors of Japanese descent
American male film actors
American male television actors
American male video game actors
American male voice actors
American film actors of Asian descent
Male actors from Dallas
Male actors from Los Angeles
Year of birth missing (living people)
21st-century American male actors